Bengt-Åke Gustafsson (born 23 March 1958) is a Swedish ice hockey coach and former ice hockey player. Gustafsson is a former head coach of the Sweden men's national ice hockey team, a post he held from February 2005 to May 2010.

During his North American career, including two games in the World Hockey Association then nine seasons in the National Hockey League with the Washington Capitals, he was often called Bengt Gustafsson or Gus.

The Capitals also selected Gustafsson's son, Anton Gustafsson, with the first of their two first-round picks in the 2008 NHL Entry Draft.

In 2003, Gustafsson was inducted into the IIHF Hall of Fame as a player.

Playing career
Gustafsson started his professional career in 1973, playing for Bofors IK in the Swedish third tier league. He later transferred to Färjestads BK of the Elitserien. Gustafsson was drafted by the Washington Capitals in the fourth round of the 1978 NHL Amateur Draft. Gustafsson chose to play the 1978–79 season in his homeland Sweden, but he signed with the WHA's Edmonton Oilers in March 1979. Gustafsson made his North American pro debut in the WHA playoffs that spring, picking up a goal and two assists in two games. When the Oilers merged into the NHL that summer, despite their attempts to select him as one of their two protected skaters for the 1979 NHL Expansion Draft, the Capitals reclaimed Gustafsson's rights from Edmonton as they did not have a valid contract with him before the draft.

In the 1986-1987 season, Gustafsson played for Bofors IK in the second highest Swedish division and still was selected for the national team, which caused some controversy, before playing two more NHL seasons. After retiring from the NHL he played with Färjestads BK for the next four seasons, then spent several years playing with VEU Feldkirch in the Austrian Hockey League and the coincident tri-nation Alpenliga, winning five Austrian ice hockey championships and the 1997–98 European Hockey League championship.

International play 

Gustafsson earned 117 caps for the Swedish national team and has played in five (1979, 1981, 1983, 1987 and 1991) World Championships with the Swedish national team. In both 1987 and 1991 he won the gold medal, got silver in 1981 and bronze in 1979.

He also played in the Canada Cup in 1984 and 1987.

In 1992 he represented Sweden in the Olympic Games in Albertville.

Coaching career
Gustafsson started his career behind the bench as an assistant coach on the Swiss national team, serving under head coach Ralph Krueger. He attended five World Championships with the Swiss team between 1998 and 2002.

Additionally Gustafsson worked as head coach of Austrian VEU Feldkirch in the 1998-99 season, followed by a two-year stint as head coach of SC Langnau of the Swiss top-flight National League A (1999-2001). In 2001, he accepted the head coaching job at Färjestads BK in the Swedish Elitserien. He guided the team to the Swedish championship in 2002 and to back-to-back finals appearances the following two years.

Gustafsson was named head coach of the Swedish national team in 2005. Under his guidance, Tre Kronor captured gold at the 2006 Olympic Games and the 2006 World Championships, becoming the first coach to achieve this "double". He earned Swedish Coach of the Year honors that year. Gustafsson also led Team Sweden to a bronze medal at the 2009 World Championships. He stepped down from his position in 2010.

In October 2010, he took over as head coach of the ZSC Lions of the Swiss top-flight National League A (NLA) and remained in the job until the end of the 2010-11 season.

On 6 May 2011 Gustafsson was named the head coach of Atlant Moscow Oblast of the Kontinental Hockey League (KHL), becoming the first Swede to be named the head coach of a KHL team. However, after a disappointing start of the 2011–12 season for Moscow Oblast, Gustafsson was forced to leave the club on 3 November 2011. The team's then assistant coach Janne Karlsson took over the head-coaching job for Moscow Oblast.

In December 2012, he was named head coach of the Nürnberg Ice Tigers of the German Deutsche Eishockey Liga and replaced Jeff Tomlinson who had been sacked. After the season, Gustafsson did not have his contract renewed.

In October 2013, he returned to Swiss SC Langnau for a second spell with the club, having previously spent two years with the Tigers. He led SCL to the NLB title and to promotion to the NLA in 2015, but parted company with the club despite the success. On January 24, 2017, he took over the head coaching position at NLB side EHC Olten. He was sacked in early February 2018 following a run of five wins in 15 contests and after dropping to the fourth place of the NLB standings.

Coaching style 
He has been reported as a "player's coach", listening to and arguing with his players rather than telling them what to do. In a SVT interview he stated: "[Ice] hockey is played on the ice, not behind the bench. As coach I can point things out to them and make them aware of stuff but they are the ones who play the game. As a player I have to confess that I didn't listen that much to what the coach said, and as a coach I don't expect them to do either."

He was criticised for asking various players whom they would like to see in the team and how they wanted to play and for asking players how they would like to see the lines formed. He then went in and adjusted the lines as the tournaments went on. The criticism has been somewhat subdued after his 2006 Olympic and IIHF WC double.

The Olympic and IIHF team only shared eight players. Most of the stars from Olympics was missing. Only Jörgen Jönsson, Kenny Jönsson, Henrik Zetterberg, Niklas Kronwall, Mikael Samuelsson, Stefan Liv, Ronnie Sundin and Mika Hannula participated in both tournaments.

Awards and achievements as player
 Named to the 1977 World Junior Championships All-Star Team
 Bronze at 1979 World Championships
 Silver at 1981 World Championships
 Named to the Swedish All-Star Team in 1983
 Named to the Swedish All-Star Team in 1987
 Awarded Guldhjälmen (Swedish Most Valuable Player) in 1990
 Gold medal at the 1987 and 1991 World Championships
 94, 95, 96, 97, 98 Austrian champion with VEU Feldkirch
 Won 1998 European Hockey League with Feldkirch
 Named to the Alpenliga All-Star Team in 1997
 2003 Inductee into the IIHF Hall of Fame

Awards and achievements as coach 
 Swedish champion as head coach for Färjestads BK in 2002
 2006 Olympic Champion and 2006 World Champion with Sweden
 Bronze medal at 2009 and 2010 World Championships
 Named as Swedish Coach of the Year in 2006
 Won NLB Championship and guided SCL Tigers to promotion to NLA in 2014-15

Records
Set a Washington Capitals record (since broken) for points by a rookie with 60 in 1979–80.
Scored the fastest goal from the start of a period (5 seconds in third period) vs. the Philadelphia Flyers on January 18, 1983.
 First coach in history to win the Olympics and the IIHF World Championship in the same year (2006).

Notable events
Scored the game-winning goal for the Washington Capitals in the franchise's first victory over the Montreal Canadiens on February 19, 1980.
Became the first Washington Capitals player to attempt two penalty shots in the same season in 1980–81.
Scored 5 goals to beat the Philadelphia Flyers 7–1 on January 8, 1984.
Played on the Swedish team that reached the Canada Cup final vs Canada in 1984.
He played his entire nine-year NHL career with the Washington Capitals and notched 555 points (196 goals, 359 assists) in 629 games.
Inducted into the International Ice Hockey Federation Hall of Fame in 2003.
Appointed head coach for the Swedish national men's ice hockey team in 2005
Became first coach in history to win both Olympic and IIHF World Championship the same year during the 2006 Winter Olympics and 2006 Ice Hockey World Championship.

Career statistics

Regular season and playoffs

International

References

External links

http://washingtoncapitalslegends.blogspot.fr/2007/07/bengt-ake-gustafsson.html

1958 births
Living people
Bofors IK players
Edmonton Oilers (WHA) players
Färjestad BK players
Ice hockey players at the 1992 Winter Olympics
IIHF Hall of Fame inductees
Olympic gold medalists for Sweden
Olympic ice hockey players of Sweden
People from Karlskoga Municipality
Sweden men's national ice hockey team coaches
Swedish expatriate sportspeople in Austria
Swedish expatriate ice hockey players in Canada
Swedish expatriate ice hockey players in the United States
Swedish ice hockey coaches
Swedish ice hockey centres
Washington Capitals draft picks
Washington Capitals players
Medalists at the 2006 Winter Olympics
Sportspeople from Örebro County